

The AME VI was a reconnaissance aircraft, produced in Spain in the mid 1920s.

Design and development

It was designed by pilot and engineer Captain Manuel Bada Vasallo assisted by Arturo González Gil based on the Bristol F.2b aircraft used at the time by the Spanish Military Air Arm (Aeronáutica Militar Española), hence its designation AME.

The two first prototypes were built in 1924 at the Aeronáutica Militar workshop in Cuatro Vientos. Conventional for its day, it was a biplane with staggered wings powered by a Hispano-Suiza 8Fb  engine. The twin-leg Lamblin radiators were mounted on the undercarriage. The pilot and observer sat in open cockpits in tandem.

Twenty examples were produced for the Aeronáutica Militar of the Spanish Army in 1925 and 1926, being incorporated in the Grupo IV unit at Melilla, along with the existing Bristol F-2b. In February 1927 the AME VI were made part of the Escuela de Observadores training unit at Cuatro Vientos. They remained in service until December 1931 when they were phased out during the military restructuring promoted by Manuel Azaña, the newly nominated Minister of War of the republican government. Azaña's aim was to modernize the Spanish military and cut down the expenses of the state in the aftermath of the Great Depression.

The AME VI was further developed with redesigned fuselage and tail unit as the AME VIA

Operators
 (Kingdom)
Aeronáutica Militar
 (Republic)
Aeronáutica Militar

Specifications

See also

References

External links

Birth, first steps and pre-war planes of the Spanish Military Aviation

1920s Spanish military reconnaissance aircraft
Biplanes
Single-engined tractor aircraft
Aircraft first flown in 1924